Brigittea innocens (syn.: Dictyna innocens)  is spider species found in Italy, Eastern Mediterranean and Kazakhstan.

See also 
 List of Dictynidae species

References

External links 

Dictynidae
Spiders of Western Asia
Spiders of Central Asia
Spiders described in 1872
Spiders of Europe